The Haval F7 is a compact sport utility vehicle produced by Great Wall Motor under the Haval marque since 2018.

History 

The vehicle debuted on 29 August 2018 at the Moscow International Automobile Salon. In November 2018, sales began in China. The  Russian market is expected to follow in the spring of 2019. The vehicle is positioned above the Haval F5 and is based on the WEY VV6. Haval provided a preview of the upcoming SUV at Auto Shanghai in April 2017 with the concept car Haval HB-03.

A 1.5-litre inline-4 engine is also offered. Power is sent to the front wheels through a seven-speed DCT with wet clutches developed by Great Wall Motor.

Haval F7x 
A fastback version of the Haval F7 called the Haval F7x debuted during the 2019 Shanghai Auto Show. The Haval F7x shares the same structures as the Haval F7, and all parts before the B-pillars are the same.

References

External links
Official website

F7
Compact sport utility vehicles
Front-wheel-drive vehicles
2010s cars
Cars introduced in 2018